On the Green Carpet is a 2001 North Korean film directed by Rim Chang-bom. The film's title refers to the turf of the stadium which hosts the May Day mass games in Pyongyang.

Summary 
The film is a romantic comedy, which involves a coach who is preparing a group of schoolchildren for the May Day mass games, and a former colleague who has now become his superior. She feels that he is being too demanding of his young performers, as the show he has devised requires a series of multiple somersaults. However, the children are willing to work as hard as necessary to please their leader, Kim Jong-il, and the film culminates in a lavish display of their abilities.

Everyday life in North Korea is presented as being pleasant and trouble-free, with no evidence of reported food shortages and an emphasis on the people's devotion to the "Dear Leader".

Festival screenings and critical response 
On the Green Carpet was the first North Korean film to be invited to the Berlin International Film Festival, where it was screened in 2004 as a special one-off event. It had been chosen by the festival committee from a selection of ten films, and aroused a great deal of interest despite being shown without subtitles and with a German language-only voice-over. The predominantly German audience who saw the film later criticized it for its "Nazi-style propaganda". Sheila Johnson of FIPRESCI regarded it as a "rare and fascinating curiosity", but noted: "On the Green Carpet, with its flat, high-key lighting, functional editing and over-fondness for the zoom lens, could have been made forty years ago; although the subject might be superficially similar, it was executed with none of the technical brilliance of a Leni Riefenstahl movie."

On the Green Carpet has previously been screened at the 23rd Moscow International Film Festival in 2001.

References

External links 
 

2001 films
2000s Korean-language films
North Korean comedy films